Papi Ricky is a Chilean television soap opera created by Sebastian Arrau, that aired on Canal 13 from 12 March to 1 October 2007, starring Jorge Zabaleta, Belén Soto, María Elena Swett and Tamara Acosta.

Remake 
Papi Ricky was remade as Papa Ricky in Malaysia by Global Station Sdn Bhd which last episode premieres 5 May 2017.

Cast 
 Jorge Zabaleta as Ricardo "Ricky" Montes.
 María Elena Swett as Catalina Rivera.
 Belén Soto as Alicia Montes.
 Pablo Cerda as Greco Ovalle.
 Tamara Acosta as Colomba Chaparro.
 María Izquierdo as Blanca De la Luz.
 Silvia Santelices as Matilde Hormazábal.
 Juan Falcón as Antonio Noriega.
 Katty Kowaleczko as Úrsula Flores.
 Leonardo Perucci as Genaro Chaparro.
 Teresita Reyes as Olga Mía Cuevas.
 Luis Gnecco as Leonardo Garay.
 Ximena Rivas as Trinidad Azócar.
 Héctor Morales as Gabriel "Gabo" Del Río.
 Arantxa Uribarri as Macarena Garay.
 Carmen Barros as Julia "Julita" Merino.
 Jorge Yáñez as Segundo Marcos.
 Grimanesa Jiménez as Fresia Huaiquimán.
 Carmen Disa Gutiérrez as Filomena Mena.
 Julio Milostich as Renato Del Río.
 María Paz Grandjean as Dolores "Lola" Meléndez.
 César Caillet as Tomás Vidal.
 Antonia Santa María as María Paz Spencer.
 María José Illanes as Pascuala Chaparro.
 Mario Horton as Valentín Carrasco.
 Lorena Capetillo as Amparo Marcos.
 Sebastián Layseca as Vasco Marcos.
 Francisca Gavilán as Andrea Kuntz.
 Remigio Remedy as Adonis López.
 Alejandro Trejo as Máximo Tapia.
 Agustín Moya as Salvador Tapia.
 Manuel Antonio Aguirre as Ignacio "Nacho" Garay.
 José Tomás Guzmán as Luis "Luchín" Marcos.
 Gonzalo Schneider as Javier Noriega.
 Josefina Dumay as Minina Noriega.
 Colomba Dumay as Manana Noriega.

Special participations 
 Magdalena Max-Neef as Gretel.
 Gabriela Medina as Manuela Pacheco
 Juan Pablo Miranda as Vladimir.
 Víctor Rojas as  Don Ulises.
 Ariel Canale as Ciro.
 Loreto Moya as Clara.
 Paula Fernández as Celeste.
 Renato Münster as Flavio.
 Mariana Prat as Patricia, Greco's mother.
 Sergio Madrid as Judge Gabo home with Macarena.
 Margarita Barón as Giselle.
 Juan Carlos Cáceres as Sr. Spencer
 Patricio Ossa as Ricardo Montes (child).
 Sandra O'Ryan as Ema.
 Tichi Lobos as Solange.
 María José Bello as Ricky's mother (child).
 Gabriela Hernández as Lucía Cuevas (only shown in a photo)

International release 
 : Canal 13 (2007) / RecTV (2014,2015-2016)
 : Zone Romantica
 : Zone Romantica
 : Viva
 : 2M TV
 : Canal 9
 : Telemix Internacional
 : Latinoamérica Televisión
 Latin America: Canal 13 International
 : Astro (2017) remake for Papa Ricky

References

External links 
  

2007 telenovelas
2007 Chilean television series debuts
2007 Chilean television series endings
Chilean telenovelas
Spanish-language telenovelas
Canal 13 (Chilean TV channel) telenovelas
Television shows set in Santiago